The Raleigh mayoral election of 1997 was held on October 7, 1997, to elect a Mayor of Raleigh, North Carolina. The election was non-partisan. It was won by Tom Fetzer, who stayed incumbent after beating Venita Peyton.

Results

References

1997
Raleigh
1997 North Carolina elections
October 1997 events in the United States